Channy is a given name. People with this name include:
Cheam Channy (born 1962), Cambodian male politician
Channy Yun (born 1973), South Korean male technologist
Chantel Woodhead (born 1974), English female footballer
Channy Leaneagh, American female musician

Unisex given names